Fred Liewehr (1909–1993) was an Austrian stage and film actor.

Partial filmography

 Jana, das Mädchen aus dem Böhmerwald (1935) - Michael
 Immortal Waltz (1939) - Johann Strauß Sohn
 Brüderlein fein (1942) - von Jaroszinsky
 Vienna Blood (1942) - Crown-Prince Ludwig von Bayern
 Late Love (1943) - von Pioletti
 The Angel with the Trumpet (1948) - Kronprinz Rudolf
 Viennese Girls (1949) - John Cross
 Child of the Danube (1950) - Georg
 Maria Theresa (1951) - Franz I.
 1. April 2000 (1952)
 Grandstand for General Staff (1953) - Erzherzog Karl Viktor
 Das Licht der Liebe (1954) - Kammersänger
 Victoria in Dover (1954) - König Leopold von Belgien
 Goetz von Berlichingen (1955) - Franz von Sickingen
 Im Prater blüh’n wieder die Bäume (1958) - Baron Lazi Köröshazi
 Der veruntreute Himmel (1958) - Leopold Argan
 Maria Stuart (1959)
 Don Carlos (1960) - Marquis von Posa
 Gustav Adolf's Page (1960) - Octavio Piccolomini
 Wedding Night in Paradise (1962) - Otto Roeders, Regines Vater
 Help, My Bride Steals (1964) - Generaldirektor Schöner, Elisabeths Vater
 An der Donau, wenn der Wein blüht (1965)
 Aunt Frieda (1965) - Prinzregent
 Onkel Filser – Allerneueste Lausbubengeschichten (1966) - Prinzregent
 When Ludwig Goes on Manoeuvres (1967) - Prinzregent Luitpold (uncredited)
 Abenteuer eines Sommers (1973) - Großvater
 Das Land des Lächelns (1974) - Graf Lichtenfels
 Anna (1988) - Sänger 'Feuerwerk' (final film role)

References

Bibliography
 Robert von Dassanowsky. Austrian Cinema: A History. McFarland, 2005.

External links

1909 births
1993 deaths
Austrian male film actors
Austrian male stage actors
People from Nový Jičín
Moravian-German people
Austrian people of Moravian-German descent